HMS Grenville, was a schooner (later re-rigged as a brig) built in Marblehead, Massachusetts, and originally named Sally. The ship was purchased and renamed Grenville (for the British Prime Minister George Grenville) by Thomas Graves, Governor of Newfoundland on 7 August 1763 in Newfoundland. From 1763 to 1767 English surveyor and explorer James Cook commanded Grenville, his first independent command. 

Over the winter of 1764–65 Grenville sailed to Deptford Dockyard for a refit. She was re-rigged as a brig, at Cook's request. Among many advantages, the greater maneuverability of a brig was important for surveying work. (It is a common misconception that a schooner of that era sailed better to windward than a brig.) Grenville left Deptford on 22 April 1765 and sighted Cape Race on 31 May.

For each summer season of Cook's command, Grenville sailed from Deptford to Newfoundland and Labrador to survey the coastal waters. Much of the area that he covered had not been surveyed in any way beforehand. Cook employed new surveying techniques, using shore-based theodolites to record the position of a ship's boat that made a running survey of depths. This avoided many of the inaccuracies of calculating the position of the surveying boat from a ship whose position might not be totally accurately known. In 1766, Cook was able to make an exact fix of longitude from observations of a solar eclipse. At the end of the 1767 surveying season, Grenville ran aground near the Nore lighthouse in a severe storm (shortly after taking on board a pilot for the Thames estuary). The crew were taken off and the ship left whilst the storm took two days to blow itself out. She was got off on the next high tide.

In 1768, Cook left Grenville to begin his first circumnavigation of the world on HMS Endeavour.

In 1770 Grenville brought troops to Tobago from Barbados and they, together with troops from Fort Granby, helped suppress a slave rebellion.

The ship was broken up in March 1775.

Citations

References
 
 
 
 
 
 
John Robson (2009). Captain Cook’s War and Peace: The Royal Navy years, 1755-1768. Seaforth Publishing.

 

1754 ships
Schooners of the Royal Navy